LC12 can refer to:

LC12 is the common name for Cape Canaveral Air Force Station Launch Complex 12
LC12 was the development code name for The Swarm (roller coaster)